was a town located in Toyota District, Hiroshima Prefecture, Japan.

As of 2003, the town had an estimated population of 9,310 and a density of 284.19 persons per km². The total area was 32.76 km².

On January 10, 2006, Setoda, along with the city of Innoshima, was merged into the expanded city of Onomichi.

Ikuchijima island in Setoda possess a large underground complex in abandoned quarry, initially used as a warehouse and a munitions factory for Nakajima Aircraft Company during the Pacific War. Now it is used as the museum and the concert hall.

References

Dissolved municipalities of Hiroshima Prefecture